Wide Awake or Wideawake may refer to:

Places
Wide Awake, South Carolina, US
Prestonville, Kentucky, US, formerly Wideawake
 Wideawake Airfield or RAF Ascension Island, a British military base

Books and publications
Wide Awake (magazine), a children's magazine 1875–1893
Wide Awake (novel), a 2006 novel by David Levithan
Project Wideawake, a fictional US government program in the Marvel Comics universe
Wide Awake, a Christian student publication, notable for Rosenberger v. University of Virginia

Film
Wide Awake (1998 film), an American film by M. Night Shyamalan
Wide Awake (2007 film), a South Korean film

Music
Wideawake, an American alternative rock band

Albums
Wide Awake (Frazier Chorus album) or the title song, 1995
Wide Awake (Joe McElderry album) or the title song, 2010
Wide Awake (Parachute album), 2016
Wide Awake!, by Parquet Courts, or the title song, 2018
Wide Awake, by Michael Schulte, 2012
Wide Awake, by Picture Me Broken, 2010

Songs
"Wide Awake" (Eric Saade song), 2016
"Wide Awake" (Katy Perry song), 2012
"Wide Awake", by Audioslave from Revelations, 2006
"Wide Awake", by Autopilot Off from Autopilot Off, 2002
"Wide Awake", by Gravity Kills from Superstarved, 2002
"Wide Awake", by Kenna from Make Sure They See My Face, 2007
"Wide Awake", by Lacuna Coil from Shallow Life, 2009
"Wide Awake", by Man Overboard from Heart Attack, 2013
"Wide Awake", by Petit Biscuit, 2019
"Wide Awake", by the Twang from Love It When I Feel Like This, 2007

Other uses
Wide Awakes, a 19th-century American political organization
Wideawake hat, a broad-brimmed felt hat
Sooty tern or wideawake, a tropical seabird